The Yardliyawara otherwise known as the Jadliaura were an indigenous Australian people of South Australia.

Language
The Yardliyawara language is classified as one of the Karnic languages, though this has been disputed, and is now classified as a dialect of Yarli.

Country
In an easterly direction the boundaries ran to Frome Downs and Holowilena Station on Siccus River. To the west the boundaries extended to Arkaba and Hawker.

People
The Yardliyawara are often subsumed under a collective tribal grouping as one of the Adnyamathanha ('Hill People'), which embraces also several other distinct groups such as the Wailpi, Kuyani, Pilatapa and Barngarla tribes. Their territory around Wertaloona had a variety of sandstone that could be used to manufacture millstones, and northern tribes would come down to trade for it.

Culture
The Yardliyawara imposed circumcision on young males undergoing initiation but refused to adopt the rite of subincision practiced by some of their neighbours.

Alternative names
 Yadliaura
 Yadlikowera, Yaldikowera (error of transposition of d and l)
 Arkaba-tura (This ethnonym combines the toponym Arkaba with the word for 'man', tura.
 Wonoka (toponym).
 Eura (this is a generic ethnonym covering several tribes).

Some words
 wilka. (tame dog)

Notes

Citations

Sources

Aboriginal peoples of South Australia